Iftekhar Anis BSP, awc, afwc, psc, PEng is a major general of the Bangladesh Army. He is incumbent chairman of Sena Kalyan Sangstha. Prior to join SKS, he was director of works and chief engineer (army) at Quarter Master General’s Branch.

Career 
Anis was commissioned on 21 December 1990 from Bangladesh Military Academy with 23rd long course in the Corps of Engineers. Anis was director general of 24 Engineering Construction Brigade. Anis served as project director of 55-kilometre Dhaka-Bhanga highway known as Padma Bridge Link Road while he was Colonel. He was deputy assistant military secretary in Military Secretary’s Branch, Army Headquarters.

References 

Living people
Bangladesh Army generals
Bangladeshi generals
Year of birth missing (living people)